Siah Darreh or Siyah Darreh or Seyah Darreh may refer to:

Siah Darreh 1, Lorestan Province
Siah Darreh 2, Lorestan Province
Siah Darreh 3, Lorestan Province
Siah Darreh, Hamadan
Siah Darreh-ye Olya, Hamadan Province
Siah Darreh, Kermanshah
Siah Darreh, Kurdistan
Seyah Darreh, Sistan and Baluchestan
Siah Darreh, South Khorasan
Siah Darreh, Tehran